Akershus is one of the 19 multi-member constituencies of the Storting, the national legislature of Norway. The constituency was established in 1921 following the introduction of proportional representation for elections to the Storting. It consists of the municipalities of Ås, Asker, Aurskog-Høland, Bærum, Eidsvoll, Enebakk, Frogn, Gjerdrum, Hurdal, Lillestrøm, Lørenskog, Lunner, Nannestad, Nes, Nesodden, Nittedal, Nordre Follo, Rælingen, Ullensaker and Vestby in the county of Viken. The constituency currently elects 18 of the 169 members of the Storting using the open party-list proportional representation electoral system. At the 2021 parliamentary election it had 471,106 registered electors.

Electoral system
Akershus currently elects 18 of the 169 members of the Storting using the open party-list proportional representation electoral system. Constituency seats are allocated by the County Electoral Committee using the Modified Sainte-Laguë method. Compensatory seats (seats at large) are calculated based on the national vote and are allocated by the National Electoral Committee using the Modified Sainte-Laguë method at the constituency level (one for each constituency). Only parties that reach the 4% national threshold compete for compensatory seats.

Election results

Summary

(Excludes compensatory seats. Figures in italics represent joint lists.)

Detailed

2020s

2021
Results of the 2021 parliamentary election held on 13 September 2021:

The following candidates were elected:
Henrik Asheim (H); Åsmund Grøver Aukrust (Ap); Une Aina Bastholm (MDG); Kirsti Bergstø (SV); Hårek Elvenes (H); Sigbjørn Gjelsvik (Sp); Himanshu Gulati (FrP); Anniken Huitfeldt (Ap); Mani Hussaini (Ap); Turid Kristensen (H); Hans Andreas Limi (FrP); Anne Kristine Linnestad (H); Marie Sneve Martinussen (R); Tuva Moflag (Ap); Sverre Myrli (Ap); Abid Raja (V); Else Marie Tveit Rødby (Sp); Jan Tore Sanner (H); and Tone Wilhelmsen Trøen (H).

2010s

2017
Results of the 2017 parliamentary election held on 11 September 2017:

The following candidates were elected:
Henrik Asheim (H); Åsmund Grøver Aukrust (Ap); Hårek Elvenes (H); Sigbjørn Gjelsvik (Sp); Himanshu Gulati (FrP); Anniken Huitfeldt (Ap); Nils Aage Jegstad (H); Kari Kjønaas Kjos (FrP); Turid Kristensen (H); Hans Andreas Limi (FrP); Tuva Moflag (Ap); Sverre Myrli (Ap); Abid Raja (V); Nina Sandberg (Ap); Jan Tore Sanner (H); Tone Wilhelmsen Trøen (H); and Nicholas Wilkinson (SV).

2013
Results of the 2013 parliamentary election held on 8 and 9 September 2013:

The following candidates were elected:
Marianne Aasen (Ap); Henrik Asheim (H); Åsmund Grøver Aukrust (Ap); Gunvor Eldegard (Ap); Sylvi Graham (H); Anniken Huitfeldt (Ap); Nils Aage Jegstad (H); Kari Kjønaas Kjos (FrP); Hans Andreas Limi (FrP); Bente Stein Mathisen (H); Sverre Myrli (Ap); Abid Raja (V); Jan Tore Sanner (H); Bård Vegar Solhjell (SV); Ib Thomsen (FrP); Mette Tønder (H); and Tone Wilhelmsen Trøen (H).

2000s

2009
Results of the 2009 parliamentary election held on 13 and 14 September 2009:

The following candidates were elected:
Marianne Aasen (Ap); Hans Frode Asmyhr (FrP); André Oktay Dahl (H); Gunvor Eldegard (Ap); Sylvi Graham (H); Knut Arild Hareide (KrF); Morten Høglund (FrP); Anniken Huitfeldt (Ap); Gorm Kjernli (Ap); Kari Kjønaas Kjos (FrP); Sverre Myrli (Ap); Jan Tore Sanner (H); Sonja Irene Sjøli (H); Bård Vegar Solhjell (SV); Borghild Tenden (V); and Ib Thomsen (FrP).

2005
Results of the 2005 parliamentary election held on 11 and 12 September 2005:

The following candidates were elected:
Marianne Aasen (Ap); Hans Frode Asmyhr (FrP); Vidar Bjørnstad (Ap); André Oktay Dahl (H); Gunvor Eldegard (Ap); Åslaug Haga (Sp); Morten Høglund (FrP); Anniken Huitfeldt (Ap); Kari Kjønaas Kjos (FrP); Sverre Myrli (Ap); Jan Petersen (H); Rolf Reikvam (SV); Jan Tore Sanner (H); Sonja Irene Sjøli (H); Borghild Tenden (V); and Ib Thomsen (FrP).

2001
Results of the 2001 parliamentary election held on 9 and 10 September 2001:

The following candidates were elected:
Siri Hall Arnøy (SV); Vidar Bjørnstad (Ap); Julie Christiansen (H); Kjell Engebretsen (Ap); Ursula Evje (FrP); Grethe Fossli (Ap); Åslaug Haga (Sp); Valgerd Svarstad Haugland (KrF); Morten Høglund (FrP); André Kvakkestad (FrP); Leif Frode Onarheim (H); Jan Petersen (H); Rolf Reikvam (SV); Jan Tore Sanner (H); and Sonja Irene Sjøli (H).

1990s

1997
Results of the 1997 parliamentary election held on 15 September 1997:

The following candidates were elected:
Vidar Bjørnstad (Ap); Anneliese Dørum (Ap); Kjell Engebretsen (Ap); Anne Enger (Sp); Ursula Evje (FrP); Grethe Fossli (Ap); Fridtjof Frank Gundersen (FrP); Valgerd Svarstad Haugland (KrF); Terje Johansen (V); Sverre Myrli (Ap); Jan Petersen (H); Rolf Reikvam (SV); Jan Tore Sanner (H); and Sonja Irene Sjøli (H).

1993
Results of the 1993 parliamentary election held on 12 and 13 September 1993:

The following candidates were elected:
Vidar Bjørnstad (Ap); Stephen Bråthen (FrP); Paul Chaffey (SV); Anneliese Dørum (Ap); Kjell Engebretsen (Ap); Anne Enger (Sp); Eva R. Finstad (H); Kaci Kullmann Five (H); Grethe Fossli (Ap); Fridtjof Frank Gundersen (FrP); Valgerd Svarstad Haugland (KrF); Jan Petersen (H); Jan Tore Sanner (H); and Solveig Torsvik (Ap).

1980s

1989
Results of the 1989 parliamentary election held on 10 and 11 September 1989:

The following candidates were elected:
Tora Aasland (SV); Jo Benkow (H); Helen Bøsterud (Ap); Paul Chaffey (SV); Anneliese Dørum (Ap); Anne Enger (Sp); Jan Erik Fåne (FrP); Eva R. Finstad (H); Kaci Kullmann Five (H); Fridtjof Frank Gundersen (FrP); Tore Haugen (H); Thor-Eirik Gulbrandsen Mykland (Ap); Jan Petersen (H); Reiulf Steen (Ap); and Finn Thoresen (FrP).

1985
Results of the 1985 parliamentary election held on 8 and 9 September 1985:

As the list alliance was entitled to more seats contesting as an alliance than it was contesting as individual parties, the distribution of seats was as list alliance votes. The Sp-KrF-DLF list alliance's seat was allocated to the Centre Party.

The following candidates were elected:
Tora Aasland (SV); Jo Benkow (H); Helen Bøsterud (Ap); Anneliese Dørum (Ap); Anne Enger (Sp); Kaci Kullmann Five (H); Terje Granerud (Ap); Carl Fredrik Lowzow (H); Thor-Eirik Gulbrandsen Mykland (Ap); Jan Petersen (H); Rolf Presthus (H); and Reiulf Steen (Ap).

1981
Results of the 1981 parliamentary election held on 13 and 14 September 1981:

The following candidates were elected:
Jo Benkow (H); Helen Bøsterud (Ap); Kaci Kullmann Five (H); Einar Førde (Ap); Terje Granerud (Ap); Fridtjof Frank Gundersen (FrP); Thor-Eirik Gulbrandsen Mykland (Ap); Carl Fredrik Lowzow (H); Jan Petersen (H); and Rolf Presthus (H).

1970s

1977
Results of the 1977 parliamentary election held on 11 and 12 September 1977:

The following candidates were elected:
Erland Asdahl (Sp); Jo Benkow (H); Helen Bøsterud (Ap); Thor Gystad (Ap); Anne-Olaug Ingeborgrud (KrF); Gerd Kirste (H); Carl Fredrik Lowzow (H); Thor-Eirik Gulbrandsen Mykland (Ap); Rolf Presthus (H); and Inger Louise Valle (Ap).

1973
Results of the 1973 parliamentary election held on 9 and 10 September 1973:

The following candidates were elected:
Egil Aarvik (KrF); Tønnes Andenæs (Ap); Jo Benkow (H); Erik Gjems-Onstad (ALP); Thor Gystad (Ap); Gerd Kirste (H); Sonja Ludvigsen (Ap); Rolf Presthus (H); Torild Skard (SV); and Bjørn Unneberg (Sp).

1960s

1969
Results of the 1969 parliamentary election held on 7 and 8 September 1969:

The following candidates were elected:
Tønnes Andenæs (Ap); Jo Benkow (H); Thor Gystad (Ap); Halfdan Hegtun (V); Sonja Ludvigsen (Ap); Rolf Presthus (H); and Bjørn Unneberg (Sp-KrF).

1965
Results of the 1965 parliamentary election held on 12 and 13 September 1965:

The following candidates were elected:
Kristian Asdahl (H); Jo Benkow (H); Hans Borgen (Sp); Thor Fossum (Ap); Halfdan Hegtun (V); Halvard Lange (Ap); and Sonja Ludvigsen (Ap).

1961
Results of the 1961 parliamentary election held on 11 September 1961:

The following candidates were elected:
Kristian Asdahl (H), 30,493 votes; Hans Borgen (Sp), 12,178 votes; Thor Fossum (Ap), 59,520 votes; Halvard Lange (Ap), 59,519 votes; John Lyng (H), 30,488 votes; Hartvig Svendsen (Ap), 59,522 votes; and Liv Tomter (Ap), 59,519 votes.

1950s

1957
Results of the 1957 parliamentary election held on 7 October 1957:

The following candidates were elected:
Hans Borgen (Bp); Hartvig Caspar Christie (H); Halvard Lange (Ap); John Lyng (H); Arne Torolf Strøm (Ap); Hartvig Svendsen (Ap); and Liv Tomter (Ap).

1953
Results of the 1953 parliamentary election held on 12 October 1953:

The following candidates were elected:
Kristian Asdahl (H); Hans Borgen (Bp); Hartvig Caspar Christie (H); Halvard Lange (Ap); Arne Torolf Strøm (Ap); Hartvig Svendsen (Ap); and Liv Tomter (Ap).

1940s

1949
Results of the 1949 parliamentary election held on 10 October 1949:

The following candidates were elected:
Hans Borgen (Bp); Hartvig Caspar Christie (H); Sverre Hope (H); Halvard Lange (Ap); Arne Torolf Strøm (Ap); Hartvig Svendsen (Ap); and Liv Tomter (Ap).

1945
Results of the 1945 parliamentary election held on 8 October 1945:

As the list alliance was not entitled to more seats contesting as an alliance than it was contesting as individual parties, the distribution of seats was as party votes.

The following candidates were elected:
Kirsten Hansteen (K); Sverre Hope (H); Trygve Lie (Ap); Herman Smitt Ingebretsen (H); Arne Torolf Strøm (Ap); Hartvig Svendsen (Ap); and Erling Wikborg (KrF).

1930s

1936
Results of the 1936 parliamentary election held on 19 October 1936:

As the list alliance was not entitled to more seats contesting as an alliance than it was contesting as individual parties, the distribution of seats was as party votes.

The following candidates were elected:
Ole Ludvig Bærøe (H); Harald Halvorsen (Ap); Christian Ludvig Jensen (H); Bernt Korslund (Ap); Trygve Lie (Ap); Marta Marie Nielsen (Ap); and Jon Sundby (Bp).

1933
Results of the 1933 parliamentary election held on 16 October 1933:

As the list alliance was not entitled to more seats contesting as an alliance than it was contesting as individual parties, the distribution of seats was as party votes.

The following candidates were elected:
Ole Ludvig Bærøe (H); Harald Gram (H); Harald Halvorsen (Ap); Bernt Korslund (Ap); Knut Monssen Nordanger (Ap); Helga Ramstad (Ap); and Jon Sundby (Bp).

1930
Results of the 1930 parliamentary election held on 20 October 1930:

As the list alliance was not entitled to more seats contesting as an alliance than it was contesting as individual parties, the distribution of seats was as party votes.

The following candidates were elected:
Finn Blakstad (H); Harald Gram (H); Harald Halvorsen (Ap); Thorleif Høilund (Ap); Knut Monssen Nordanger (Ap); Alf Staver (H); and Jon Sundby (Bp).

1920s

1927
Results of the 1927 parliamentary election held on 17 October 1927:

The following candidates were elected:
Harald Gram (H); Harald Halvorsen (Ap); Thorleif Høilund (Ap); Knut Monssen Nordanger (Ap); Jon Sundby (Bp); Rolf Thommessen (FV); and Anders Venger (H).

1924
Results of the 1924 parliamentary election held on 21 October 1924:

The following candidates were elected:
Olaf Bryn (H); Harald Halvorsen (S); Alfred Madsen (Ap); Peter Andreas Morell (H); Knut Monssen Nordanger (Ap); Jon Sundby (Bp); and Anders Venger (H).

1921
Results of the 1921 parliamentary election held on 24 October 1921:

The following candidates were elected:
Jacob Brevig (H-FV); Olaf Bryn (H-FV); Harald Halvorsen (S); Alfred Madsen (Ap); Peter Andreas Morell (H-FV); Jon Sundby (L); and Anders Venger (H-FV).

Notes

References

Storting constituency
Storting constituencies
Storting constituencies established in 1921